Ørnen Rocks is a group of rocks, some of which are above water, 1 nautical mile (1.9 km) northeast of Cape Melville, King George Island, in the South Shetland Islands. Named after the Norwegian whaler Ørnen which went aground there about 1908 or 1909.

Rock formations of King George Island (South Shetland Islands)